Irving John Medlinger (June 18, 1927 – September 3, 1975) was a professional baseball player.  He was a left-handed pitcher over parts of two seasons (1949, 1951) with the St. Louis Browns.  For his career, he did not record a decision, with a 13.83 earned run average, and 9 strikeouts in 13.2 innings pitched.

He was born in Chicago. He was one of two people killed aboard a Piper PA-24 Comanche destroyed on September 3, 1975, while attempting a crash-landing near Wheeling, Illinois, after its engine failed. He died at the age of 48.

References

External links

1927 births
1975 deaths
Accidental deaths in Illinois
Baltimore Orioles (IL) players
Baseball players from Chicago
Birmingham Barons players
Durham Bulls players
Major League Baseball pitchers
Oneonta Red Sox players
Richmond Virginians (minor league) players
St. Louis Browns players
San Antonio Missions players
Scranton Red Sox players
Toronto Maple Leafs (International League) players
Victims of aviation accidents or incidents in the United States
Victims of aviation accidents or incidents in 1975